Agave titanota, the chalk agave, is a species of flowering plant in the family Asparagaceae. It is a medium-sized evergreen succulent perennial native to Oaxaca, Mexico. It often reaches 1-2 feet tall and 2-3 feet wide.

The plant forms a solitary rosette of broad whitish green leaves with variable spines, which are 1-2 feet long and 5 inches wide, typically narrower toward the base and widest near the tip. Occasionally, it produces offsets. Mature plants may produce a flower head from 3m to 6m tall with yellow flowers. As it is monocarpic, this signals the death of the plant.

It has gained the Royal Horticultural Society’s Award of Garden Merit. This plant is suitable for USDA hardiness zones 9-11. It may be susceptible to scale insects and chlorosis resulting from magnesium deficiency.

Cultivars include 'White Ice', 'Filigree', and 'Solar Eclipse.'

References

titanota
Endemic flora of Mexico
Flora of Oaxaca